The Sistan angular-toed gecko (Cyrtopodion sistanense) is a species of gecko, a lizard in the family Gekkonidae. The species is endemic to Iran.

Geographic range
C. sistanense is found in Sistan and Baluchestan Province in southeastern Iran.

Reproduction
C. sistanense is oviparous.

References

Further reading
Nazarov, Roman A.; Rajabizadeh, Mehdi (2007). "A New Species of Angular-Toed Gecko of the Genus Cyrtopodion (Squamata: Sauria: Gekkonidae) from South-East Iran (Sistan-Baluchistan Province)". Russian Journal of Herpetology 14 (2): 137-144. (Cyrtopodion sistanensis, new species).

Cyrtopodion
Reptiles described in 2007
Geckos of Iran